Grand Parc tram stop is a tram stop on line C of the Tramway de Bordeaux. It is located on Avenue Emile Counord in the city of Bordeaux. The stop is operated by Transports Bordeaux Métropole.

For most of the day on Mondays to Fridays, trams run at least every five minutes in both directions. Services run less frequently in the early morning, late evenings, weekends and public holidays.

Close by
 Grand Parc

References

Bordeaux tramway stops
Tram stops in Bordeaux
Railway stations in France opened in 2007